is the sixth live album by Japanese idol duo Pink Lady. Recorded live during their Christmas concert at the Nippon Budokan on December 25, 1978, it was released on February 5, 1979.

The album peaked at No. 24 on Oricon's weekly albums chart and sold over 26,000 copies.

Track listing

Album chart position

References

External links

 
 

1979 live albums
Pink Lady (band) live albums
Albums recorded at the Nippon Budokan
Japanese-language live albums
Victor Entertainment live albums